Kalwan is a tehsil in Kalwan subdivision of Nashik District in Maharashtra, India. Kalwan is situated 80 km from Nashik and 251 km from state capital Mumbai.  Saptashrungi Gad, a religious shrine of Goddess Saptashrungi, is situated in Kalwan taluka. Saptashrungi Gad is located 22 km from Kalwan city. Dhodap hill fort, which is a popular mountain climbing destination and 3rd highest peak in Maharashtra, is situated 8 km from Kalwan city. Abhona is the largest town in Kalwan tehsil after Kalwan city. Kalwan is situated in the delta of Behadi and Girana river. Black soil and ample water are available  for cultivation of cash crops. This significantly contributes to the GDP of Kalwan tehsil.

Notes

Talukas in Maharashtra
Nashik district